Totontepec Mixe, called North Highland Mixe in Wichmann (1995), is a Mixe language spoken in Mexico, in the town of Totontepec Villa de Morelos, Oaxaca.

Notes

References
Schoenhals, Alvin & Louise Schoenhals, 1965, Vocabulario Mixe de Totontepec, Serie de Vocabularios Indigénas "Mariano Silva y Aceves" Num. 14. SIL, Mexico, D.F. Available online
Wichman, Søren, 1995, The Relationship among the Mixe–Zoquean Languages of Mexico. Salt Lake City: University of Utah Press.

External links

Totontepec Mixe web page

Mixe–Zoque languages